Borislav Bratkov Tsvetkov (born July 9, 1967 in Vidin) is a Bulgarian sprint canoer who competed in the late 1980s. He was eliminated in the semifinals of the K-4 1000 m event at the 1988 Summer Olympics in Seoul.

References
 Sports-reference.com profile

1967 births
Bulgarian male canoeists
Canoeists at the 1988 Summer Olympics
Living people
Olympic canoeists of Bulgaria
People from Vidin